Classeya placydioni is a moth in the family Crambidae. It was described by Stanisław Błeszyński in 1960. It is found in Senegal.

References

Crambinae
Moths described in 1960